General Brooks may refer to:

Allison Brooks (1917–2006), U.S. Air Force major general
Dallas Brooks (1896–1966), British Army general
Edward H. Brooks (1893–1978), U.S. Army lieutenant general
Horace Brooks (1814–1894), Union army brevet brigadier general
Leo A. Brooks Jr. (born 1957), U.S. Army brigadier general
Leo A. Brooks Sr. (born 1932), U.S. Army major general
Micah Brooks (1775–1857), New York State Infantry major general
T. B. Henderson Brooks (1909–1997), British Indian Army lieutenant general
Theodore Marley Brooks, fictional brigadier general in Doc Savage media
Vincent K. Brooks (born 1958), U.S. Army four-star general 
William T. H. Brooks (1821–1870), Union Army major general

See also
Simon Brooks-Ward (fl. 1980s–2020s), British Army major general